Leyla Arely González Campos (born 30 March 1990) is a Salvadoran footballer who plays as a defender for CD FAS and El Salvador women's national team.

Club career
González has played for FAS in El Salvador.

International career
González capped for El Salvador at senior level during the 2010 CONCACAF Women's World Cup Qualifying qualification and the 2012 CONCACAF Women's Olympic Qualifying Tournament qualification.

See also
List of El Salvador women's international footballers

References

1990 births
Living people
Salvadoran women's footballers
Women's association football defenders
El Salvador women's international footballers